Philip Meyer is professor emeritus and former holder of the Knight Chair in Journalism at the University of North Carolina at Chapel Hill. He researches in the areas of journalism quality, precision journalism, civic journalism, polling, the newspaper industry, and communications technology.  Meyer was a Nieman Fellow in 1966–1967.

Before becoming a professor in 1981, Meyer was employed in the newspaper industry for a total of 26 years, the last 23 with Knight Ridder, where he started as a reporter for the Miami Herald. In 1962, he became the Washington correspondent for the Akron Beacon Journal, then a national correspondent, and finally, from 1978 to 1981, the director of news research at company headquarters in Miami, where he worked on Knight Ridder's Viewtron online service.

One of the earliest examples of computer-assisted reporting was in 1967, after riots in Detroit, when Meyer, on temporary assignment with the Detroit Free Press, used survey research, analyzed on a mainframe computer, to show that people who had attended college were equally likely to have rioted as were high school dropouts.

The National Institute for Computer-Assisted Reporting hosts the annual Philip Meyer Journalism Award, which "recognize excellent journalism done using social science research methods".

Meyer was a member of Board of Contributors for USA TODAY's Forum Page, part of the newspaper's Opinion section.

The Summer 2008 Carolina Communicator includes a profile of Meyer, written by one of his former students, John Bare.

Bibliography

References

External links 
 Meyer's C.V. at University of North Carolina

University of North Carolina at Chapel Hill faculty
Nieman Fellows
Living people
Detroit Free Press people
1930 births